Live Dudes is a three song live EP by American rock band Cartel. The EP is packaged for free with the re-release of the group's 2005 debut album, Chroma, available only at independent retail stores.  The re-release was the same as the original, with a full band performance of "Save Us" instead of the all piano version, and the addition of this EP, new artwork, and exclusive access to the band's online fanclub.

Track listing

Personnel
Will Pugh – vocals
Joseph Pepper – guitar
Nic Hudson – guitar
Ryan Roberts – bass
Kevin Sanders – drums

Aaron Johnson - Mixing

External links 
Retail stores that carry the re-release of Chroma

Cartel (band) albums
2006 live albums
2006 EPs
Live EPs